A quad antenna is a type of directional wire radio antenna used on the HF and VHF bands. Like a Yagi–Uda antenna ("Yagi"), a quad consists of a driven element and one or more parasitic elements; however in a quad, each of these elements is a loop antenna, which may be square, round, or some other shape.  It is used by radio amateurs on the HF and VHF amateur bands.

History 
The quad antenna is a development of several inventions.

In 1924, Moses Jacobson patented a loop antenna with rhombic shape.
In 1938, George Brown et al. patented a loop antenna with rhombic shape and quarterwave sides.
In 1951 Clarence C. Moore, W9LZX, a Christian Missionary and engineer at HCJB (a shortwave missionary radio station high in the Andean Mountains) developed and patented  a two-turn loop antenna that he called a "quad". He developed this antenna to resolve issues caused by large coronal discharges while using a beam antenna in the thin air of higher altitudes. Moore describes his antenna as "a pulled-open folded dipole".  While the main point of Moore's patent was the two turn single loop design which is not the antenna termed "quad" today, the patent does include a mention and illustration of a two element unidirectional "quad", and describes the time when the full wave loop concept was developed:

Moore's design eliminated interference from coronal discharge. "End effect", which is inherent with the Yagi, is absent in a quad because its elements have no ends. But other advantages appeared. The higher impedance mentioned in the quote above translates to lower current and thus lower loss on the transmission lines, and gain is higher than that of a Yagi.
In 1957 James Sherriff McCaig patented what we know as a "cubical" (two-element) multi-band quad antenna.
In 1960 Rudolf Baumgartner patented the Swiss quad
In 1969 Werner Boldt invented the DJ4VM quad.
In 1971 Hans F. Ruckert invented the "Mono-Loop Tri-Band Cubical Quad" .

Advantages over a Yagi–Uda 
Rigorous testing of the quad antenna show the following advantages over a Yagi–Uda antenna.

Polarization
It is easy to change polarization from vertical to horizontal.

Multiband antenna
It is easier to design a multiband quad antenna than a multiband Yagi antenna.

Higher gain 
The 2-element quad has almost the same gain as a 3-element Yagi: about 7.5 dB over a dipole. Likewise, a 3-element quad has more gain than a 3-element Yagi. However, adding quad elements produces diminishing returns. Quoting from William Orr, "Whereas parasitic beams having twenty or thirty parasitic directors are efficient, high gain antennas, it would seem ... that maximum practical number of parasitic loop elements for the quad array is limited to four or five." (Orr, p. 48)

Radiation resistance 
Radiation resistance is affected by antenna height above ground, element spacing, and environmental conditions. However, values will be higher than for a Yagi and more closely matched to a 50 Ohm coaxial feed.

Lower boom height 
"A two-element, three-band quad, with elements mounted only 35 feet above ground, will give good performance in situations where a triband Yagi will not."

Shorter boom 
William Orr's book shows a 10-15-20 meter, 2-element Quad with boom length of 6′10″.

Internally stackable 
Interaction between antennas of a multiband quad are quite low, even when fed with a single feed line. (Orr, 1959, pg. 63)

Lower radiation angle 
According to Root (2008) a false claim has persisted for 50 years that quads "open the band earlier", which suggests that quads exhibit a lower angle of radiation than Yagis; computer modelling fails to show any such difference. Root proposes that the vertical sides of each element may actually radiate the low angle component.

Disadvantages compared to other antennas

Bandwidth 
If tuned for maximum gain, the bandwidth for a 3-element quad antenna is limited: Deviation from the design frequency will unbalance the near-resonance condition of the parasitic elements. However, lengthening the director elements, thereby sacrificing approximately 1 dB gain, allows for much broader bandwidth.

Maintenance 
A quad is a 3-dimensional antenna so maintenance can be difficult. Even with a tilt-over tower, tall ladders or a bucket truck may be needed. There are devices that will allow the tilting of the tower to the ground to work on a cubical quad antenna, rotator, or tower. It works by letting the quad loops swivel out of the way. When the tower is in the operational position the elements are locked into position (the locking mechanism is powered by gravity).

The E-Z-O variation 

In 2008, Daniel Mills, N8PPQ, designed an antenna that may be an improvement over the quad design. His E-Z-O antenna uses flexible dielectric tubes rather than rigid poles to support the electrical elements. He claims slightly higher gain over the quad due to its roughly circular form.

The magnitude of the dielectric effect on the outside band elements was surprising. Experimentation was required to establish optimum element lengths. Referencing literature was not to be found. David J Jefferies and Athanasios Koulouris reported that "As far as we are aware, there has been no reported work on encasing loop antennas in dielectric."

References

External links 
 Building a Quad Antenna by Dean VK5DJM.
 Antenas Cúbicas Quad antennas page info by EA1DDO, in Spanish.
 Quad Antenna Gallery Large Quad Antenna gallery with +300 photos.
 N8PPQ N8PPQ's circular quad antenna.
 N6ACH N6ACH Cubical Quad Antenna Calculator.
  WA2OOO WA2OOO Cubical Quad guide to Advantages and Dimensions and Calculator. 
Cubical quad tutorial

Radio frequency antenna types
Antennas (radio)